Lomas Taurinas is a neighborhood of Tijuana. Presidential candidate Luis Donaldo Colosio was assassinated here while on his campaign tour.

References

History of Tijuana
Neighborhoods in Tijuana